Elfriede Kaun (5 October 1914 – 5 March 2008) was a German high jumper.

Born in Büttel, Steinburg, she won the bronze medal at the 1936 Summer Olympics in Berlin. Her personal best jump was 1.63 metres.

She competed for the sports club Kieler TV, and died in 2008 in Kiel. She was the last living German athlete who won a medal at the 1936 Summer Olympics.

References
Obituary 

1914 births
2008 deaths
German female high jumpers
Athletes (track and field) at the 1936 Summer Olympics
Olympic athletes of Germany
Olympic bronze medalists for Germany
Medalists at the 1936 Summer Olympics
Olympic bronze medalists in athletics (track and field)
People from Steinburg
Sportspeople from Schleswig-Holstein